Evans Chikwaikwai (born 14 August 1985 in Rusape's Vengere Township) is a Zimbabwean footballer who has played as a striker for Bidvest Wits in the South African Premier Soccer League.

Early life
Chikwaikwai attended Vengere Primary School from 1990 to 1997 and proceeded to Vengere High School for his 'O' levels. Chikwaikwai left Vengere to study at Mutare Boys High School on a sports scholarship. There, he became a key utility player for the school team.

Career
Chikwaikwai played alongside his oldest brother Manyowa for Rusape side Grain Masters between 2000 and 2004 before coming to Harare for trials with premiership side CAPS United. The move was stalled when he sustained a career-threatening ankle injury during a training session. The former Njube Sundowns striker was named Zimbabwe's 2008/9 'Soccer Star of the Year' after he finished as the league's top goal-scorer with 23 goals in 28 games. He donated part of his prize money to Maggies Day Centre, an orphanage at his home area of Rusape. Bidvest Wits manager Roger de Sa described Chikwaikwai as "an exceptional striker". He also won the golden boot award.

On 17 February 2010, Chikwaikwai was loaned to Liga Muçulmana de Maputo in Mozambique until 30 June 2010. On 16 June 2011, Zimbabwe international and former Warriors forward Evans Chikwaikwai joined premiership newcomers Chicken Inn.

References

1985 births
Living people
Sportspeople from Manicaland Province
Zimbabwean footballers
Zimbabwe international footballers
Zimbabwean expatriate footballers
Expatriate soccer players in South Africa
Zimbabwean expatriate sportspeople in South Africa
Expatriate footballers in Mozambique
Zimbabwean expatriate sportspeople in Mozambique
Njube Sundowns F.C. players
Bidvest Wits F.C. players
Liga Desportiva de Maputo players
Hanover Park F.C. players
CD Costa do Sol players
Chicken Inn F.C. players
Association football forwards